The 1908–09 MIT Engineers men's ice hockey season was the 10th season of play for the program.

Season

The team did not have a head coach but William O'Hearn served as team manager.

Note: Massachusetts Institute of Technology athletics were referred to as 'Engineers' or 'Techmen' during the first two decades of the 20th century. By 1920 all sports programs had adopted the Engineer moniker.

Roster

Standings

Schedule and Results

|-
!colspan=12 style=";" | Regular Season

† The Game was postponed from December 31.‡ The team was composed of Brown students without any official sanction from the University.

References

MIT Engineers men's ice hockey seasons
MIT
MIT
MIT
MIT
MIT